Cyclingnews.com is a website providing cycling news, race results, bike-related reviews and buying advice owned by Future.

History
In 1995 Australian Bill Mitchell, a keen cyclist and professor of economics at the University of Newcastle, created the website titled "Bill’s Cycling Racing Results and News" after finding there was a need for fast-breaking news and race results in English-speaking countries. In 1999 Sydney-based publishing company Knapp Communications purchased the website from Mitchell, and in July 2007 they sold it to British publisher Future plc for £2.2m. In July 2014 it was bought by Immediate Media Company, along with the print-only Procycling magazine. In February 2019, Immediate Media sold its cycling titles back to Future.

See also

 Pedaltech-Cyclingnews-Jako
 Cycling Weekly
 VeloNews

References

External links

Internet properties established in 1995
British sport websites
Cycling websites